Robert Burrows (1810, Ipswich-10 November 1883, Ipswich) was an English artist and pioneer of photography.

He joined the Ipswich Society of Professional & Amateur Artists soon after it was established by Henry Davy in 1832. Davy provided artistic instruction to Burrows alongside other ipswich artists.

References

1810 births
1883 deaths